Frank Verstraete (born November 1972) is a Belgian quantum physicist who is working on the interface between quantum information theory and quantum many-body physics. He pioneered the use of tensor networks and entanglement theory in quantum many body systems. He holds the Leigh Trapnell Professorship of Quantum Physics at the Faculty of Mathematics, University of Cambridge, and is professor at the Faculty of Physics at Ghent University.

Career 
Verstraete obtained a degree of civil engineering in Louvain and of Master in Physics from Ghent University, and obtained his PhD on the topic of quantum entanglement in 2002 under supervision of Bart De Moor and Henri Verschelde at the KU Leuven. He pioneered the use of quantum entanglement as a unifying theme for describing strongly interacting quantum many-body systems, which are among the most challenging systems to analyze theoretically or numerically, but also very promising for future quantum technologies such as quantum computers. After working as a postdoc at the Max Planck Institute for Quantum Optics in the group of Ignacio Cirac (2002–2004) and at the California Institute of Technology (2004–2006), he became full professor and the chair of theoretical quantum nanophysics at the University of Vienna in 2006. He moved back to Ghent University with an Odysseus grant from the FWO in 2012, where he has since built a large research group on applications of entanglement in quantum many-body systems. Since the fall 2022, he holds the chair of Quantum Physics at to the Department of Applied Mathematics and Theoretical Physics of the University of Cambridge.

Scientific work 
Among his notable contributions is the discovery that there are nine different ways (represented by equivalence classes under stochastic LOCC operations (SLOCC)) in which four qubits can be entangled, the theoretical demonstration that a universal quantum computer can be realized entirely by dissipation, and the development of a quantum generalization of the classical Metropolis algorithm to find ground states of many-body Hamiltonians.
He played a leading role in the development of modern variational methods of quantum many-body physics based on Matrix product states (MPS), Tensor network states, and Projected entangled pair states (PEPS) and applying them to problems in condensed-matter physics, many-body physics, and quantum field theory. Among others, he was among the authors introducing fermionic PEPS, continuous MPS, and matrix product operators, and he is co-author of a highly cited review on the topic.

Awards 
Verstraete has received numerous awards, among them the Lieben Prize in 2009 and the Francqui Prize in 2018 and is also distinguished visiting research chair at the Perimeter Institute for Theoretical Physics in Waterloo, Ontario.

Selected publications 
 A study of entanglement in quantum information theory, Ph.D. Thesis, Katholieke Universiteit Leuven, 2002.

References

Belgian physicists
Academic staff of the University of Vienna
Academic staff of Ghent University
Living people
1972 births